FC Khimki is a Russian professional football club based in Khimki. The club returned to the Russian Premier League in the 2020–21 season.

History
The team was formed in 1996 by merging two amateur clubs from Khimki, Rodina, and Novator. Khimki entered the amateur league and played their first official match on 17 May 1997. Of more than 150 amateur teams in the competition, only the champions would be promoted to the Third League. Khimki won the tournament, overcoming Energiya Ulyanovsk in the final match in a penalty shootout.

On 30 January 1997, Khimki became a professional football club. In the Third League regional tournament, Khimki finished second and were promoted to the Second League.

Khimki were promoted to the First Division after the 2000 season. They finished first in the Centre zone of the Second Division, but lost the promotion play-off to Severstal Cherepovets on away goals. After Severstal refused to play in the First Division, their place was given to Khimki.

In 2005, Khimki had a very good run in the Russian Cup, reaching the final. They lost the final match 0–1 to CSKA. In the 2019–20 Russian Cup, they reached the final once again.

On 15 May 2020, FNL season was abandoned due to the COVID-19 pandemic in Russia. As the club was in the 2nd position in the standings, they were promoted to the Russian Premier League for the 2020–21 season, returning to the top level after an 11-year break.

League history
{| class="wikitable mw-collapsible mw-collapsed" align=center cellspacing="0" cellpadding="3" style="border:1px solid #AAAAAA;font-size:90%"
|-bgcolor="#efefef"
! Season
! Div.
! Pos.
! Pl.
! W
! D
! L
! GS
! GA
! P
!Cup
!colspan=2|Europe
!Top Scorer (League)
!Head Coach
|-
|align=center|1997
|align=center|4th, Zone 3
|align=center bgcolor="lightgreen"|2
|align=center|40
|align=center|26
|align=center|6
|align=center|8
|align=center|80
|align=center|38
|align=center|84
|align=center|-
|align=center colspan=2|—
|align=left| Kravchuk – 17
|align=left| Shtapov
|-
|align=center|1998
|align=center|3rd, "West"
|align=center|10
|align=center|40
|align=center|15
|align=center|8
|align=center|17
|align=center|63
|align=center|60
|align=center|53
|align=center|-
|align=center colspan=2|—
|align=left| Georgievsky – 11
|align=left| Dementyev Bychkov Sabitov
|-
|align=center|1999
|align=center rowspan="2"|3rd, "Centre"
|align=center|6
|align=center|36
|align=center|17
|align=center|11
|align=center|8
|align=center|51
|align=center|35
|align=center|62
|align=center|R256
|align=center colspan=2|—
|align=left| Khamzin – 11
|align=left| Sabitov Kots
|-
|align=center|2000
|align=center bgcolor="lightgreen"|1
|align=center|38
|align=center|28
|align=center|4
|align=center|6
|align=center|68
|align=center|22
|align=center|88
|align=center|R64
|align=center colspan=2|—
|align=left| Genich – 18
|align=left| Piskaryov Papaev
|-
|align=center|2001
|align=center rowspan="6"|2nd
|align=center|12
|align=center|34
|align=center|13
|align=center|4
|align=center|17
|align=center|42
|align=center|54
|align=center|43
|align=center|R32
|align=center colspan=2|—
|align=left| Shcheglov – 5 Voronkov – 5 Kovardayev – 5
|align=left| Petrushin Sabitov
|-
|align=center|2002
|align=center|7
|align=center|34
|align=center|14
|align=center|10
|align=center|10
|align=center|38
|align=center|27
|align=center|52
|align=center|R32
|align=center colspan=2|—
|align=left| Kovardayev – 6
|align=left| Sabitov Derkach
|-
|align=center|2003
|align=center|12
|align=center|42
|align=center|16
|align=center|9
|align=center|17
|align=center|36
|align=center|46
|align=center|57
|align=center|QF
|align=center colspan=2|—
|align=left| Kiselyov – 15
|align=left| Derkach Galyamin
|-
|align=center|2004
|align=center|5
|align=center|42
|align=center|17
|align=center|10
|align=center|15
|align=center|39
|align=center|33
|align=center|61
|align=center|R32
|align=center colspan=2|—
|align=left| Pogrebnyak – 6
|align=left| Shevchuk Yakovenko
|-
|align=center|2005
|align=center|4
|align=center|42
|align=center|23
|align=center|13
|align=center|6
|align=center|75
|align=center|36
|align=center|82
|align=center bgcolor="silver"|RU
|align=center colspan=2|—
|align=left| Tikhonov – 15
|align=left| Yakovenko
|-
|align=center|2006
|align=center bgcolor="lightgreen"|1
|align=center|42
|align=center|30
|align=center|9
|align=center|3
|align=center|83
|align=center|30
|align=center|99
|align=center|R64
|align=center colspan=2|—
|align=left| Tikhonov – 22
|align=left| Kazachyonok
|-
|align=center|2007
|align=center rowspan="3"|1st
|align=center|9
|align=center|30
|align=center|9
|align=center|10
|align=center|11
|align=center|32
|align=center|33
|align=center|37
|align=center|R32
|align=center colspan=2|—
|align=left| Shirokov – 7
|align=left| Muslin
|-
|align=center|2008
|align=center|14
|align=center|30
|align=center|6
|align=center|9
|align=center|15
|align=center|34
|align=center|54
|align=center|27
|align=center|R16
|align=center colspan=2|—
|align=left| Nizamutdinov – 9
|align=left| Yuran
|-
|align=center|2009
|align=center bgcolor="pink"|16
|align=center|30
|align=center|2
|align=center|4
|align=center|24
|align=center|20
|align=center|64
|align=center|10
|align=center|R32
|align=center colspan=2|—
|align=left| Antipenko – 6
|align=left| Sarsaniya Chugainov
|-
|align=center|2010
|align=center rowspan="3"|2nd
|align=center|13
|align=center|38
|align=center|11
|align=center|17
|align=center|10
|align=center|39
|align=center|38
|align=center|50
|align=center|R32
|align=center colspan=2|—
|align=left| Yusupov – 7 Dudchenko – 7
|align=left| Tarkhanov Bushmanov
|-
|align=center|2011–12
|align=center|13
|align=center|48
|align=center|16
|align=center|11
|align=center|21
|align=center|54
|align=center|74
|align=center|59
|align=center|R32
|align=center colspan=2|—
|align=left| Mamtov – 10
|align=left| Grigoryan Dolmatov Tarkhanov
|- align=center
|2012–13
|bgcolor=pink|16
|32
|6
|10
|16
|23
|40
|28
|R16
|colspan=2|—
|align=left| Komkov – 3 Khatazhyonkov – 3
|align=left| Tarkhanov Tetradze Petrakov
|- align=center
|2013–14
|rowspan=3|3rd, "West"
|3
|32
|16
|10
|6
|67
|37
|58
|R64
|colspan=2|—
|align=left| Antonnikov – 9 Zemchenkov – 9
|align=left| Tarkhanov Mukhanov Gridin
|- align=center
|2014–15
|4
|30
|15
|9
|6
|42
|27
|54
|R256
|colspan=2|—
|align=left| Lipatkin – 6
|align=left|  Maminov
|- align=center
|2015–16
|bgcolor="lightgreen"|1
|24
|19
|5
|0
|49
|12
|62
|R16
|colspan=2|—
|align=left|  Markosov – 11
|align=left| Khafizov
|- align=center
|align=center|2016–17
|align=center rowspan="4"|2nd
|align=center|11
|align=center|38
|align=center|11
|align=center|16
|align=center|11
|align=center|40
|align=center|47
|align=center|49
|align=center|R32
|align=center colspan=2|—
|align=left| Kazaev – 8
|align=left| Irkhin
|- align=center
|align=center|2017–18
|align=center|13
|align=center|38
|align=center|12
|align=center|7
|align=center|19
|align=center|33
|align=center|49
|align=center|43
|align=center|R64
|align=center colspan=2|—
|align=left| Kuzmichev – 7
|align=left| Irkhin
|- align=center
|align=center|2018–19
|align=center|9
|align=center|38
|align=center|14
|align=center|11
|align=center|13
|align=center|47
|align=center|49
|align=center|53
|align=center|R32
|align=center colspan=2|—
|align=left| Kukharchuk – 10
|align=left| Shalimov
|- align=center
|align=center|2019–20
|bgcolor="lightgreen"|2
|align=center|27
|align=center|16
|align=center|6
|align=center|5
|align=center|50
|align=center|19
|align=center|54
|align=center bgcolor="silver"|RU
|align=center colspan=2|—
|align=left|  Aliyev – 8
|align=left| Yuran
|-
|align=center|2020–21
|align=center|1st
|align=center|8
|align=center|30
|align=center|13
|align=center|6
|align=center|11
|align=center|35
|align=center|39
|align=center|45
|align=center|R16
|align=center colspan=2|—
|align=left| Mirzov – 6
|align=left| Yuran
|-
|align=center|2021–22
|align=center|1st
|align=center|13
|align=center|30
|align=center|7
|align=center|11
|align=center|12
|align=center|34
|align=center|47
|align=center|32
|align=center|GS
|align=center colspan=2|—
|align=left| Glushakov – 10
|align=left| Cherevchenko
|}

Current squad

Out on loan

Reserve team

Notable players
Had international caps for their respective countries. Players whose name is listed in bold represented their countries while playing for Khimki.

Russia
 Vladimir Beschastnykh
 Viktor Budyanskiy
 Aleksei Bugayev
 Andrei Chichkin
 Denis Davydov
 Yuri Drozdov
 Denis Glushakov
 Maksim Glushenkov
 Valeri Kleimyonov
 Andrei Kondrashov
 Fyodor Kudryashov
 Arseniy Logashov
 Ilya Maksimov
 Pavel Mamayev
 Pavel Mogilevets
 Andrei Mostovoy
 Elmir Nabiullin
 Sergei Nekrasov
 Pavel Pogrebnyak
 Denis Popov
 Igor Portnyagin
 Aleksandr Ryazantsev
 Roman Shirokov
 Sergei Terekhov
 Andrey Tikhonov
 Yegor Titov
 Roman Vorobyov
 Renat Yanbayev
 Andrey Yeshchenko
 Artur Yusupov
 Yuri Zhirkov

Armenia
 Artak Aleksanyan
 Roman Berezovsky
 Barsegh Kirakosyan
 Arshak Koryan
 Artur Yedigaryan
 Robert Zebelyan

Azerbaijan
 Emin Agaev
 Kamran Aliyev

Belarus
 Dmitry Aliseiko
 Timofei Kalachev
 Dzyanis Kowba
 Artsyom Radzkow
 Maksim Romaschenko

Bosnia and Herzegovina
 Dragan Blatnjak
 Ricardo Santos Lago
 Vule Trivunović
 Zoran Amidžić

Czech Republic
 Tomas Vychodil

Estonia
 Andrei Stepanov
 Vladimir Voskoboinikov

Finland
 Boris Rotenberg

Georgia
 Valeri Abramidze
 Gogita Gogua
 Giorgi Lomaia
 Giorgi Navalovski
 Edik Sadzhaya
 Georgi Mikadze
 Vladimir Gogberashvili

Kazakhstan
 Islambek Kuat
 Dmitriy Lyapkin
 Roman Uzdenov

Latvia
 Oskars Kļava

Lithuania
 Darius Miceika
 Mantas Samusiovas
 Valdas Trakys

Moldova
 Victor Golovatenco
 Oleg Hromtov
 Iurie Priganiuc
 Radu Rebeja
 Oleg Shishkin

Romania
 Florin Costin Șoavă

Serbia
 Dragan Mrđa

Slovakia
 Martin Jakubko

Slovenia
 Nastja Čeh

Sweden
 Filip Dagerstål

Ukraine
 Serhiy Danylovskyi
 Dmytro Parfenov

Asia

Turkmenistan
 Vladimir Bayramov

Uzbekistan
 Igor Golban
 Vladimir Shishelov
 Ilya Telegin

Africa

Burkina Faso
 Mohamed Konaté

Morocco
 Abdelillah Bagui

Nigeria
 Richard Eromoigbe
 Brian Idowu
 Chidi Osuchukwu

Senegal
 Dame Diop

Club records

Most league appearances for Khimki
 Miodrag Jovanović: 224
 Roman Berezovsky: 175
 Nikolai Barkalov: 164
 Sergei Kravchuk: 145
 Aleksandr Shulenin: 140
 Andrey Tikhonov: 124
 Aleksandr Makarov: 119
 Aleksandr Shvetsov: 116
 Igor Nekrasov: 115
  Sergei Shcheglov: 112

Most league goals for Khimki
Sergei Kravchuk: 46
Andrey Tikhonov: 43
Yuri Georgiyevsky: 30
Konstantin Genich: 29
Nikolai Kovardayev: 27
Vadim Shatalin: 23
Aleksandr Antipenko: 20
Denis Kiselyov: 18
Anton Arkhipov: 16

Coaching staff

Managers
Vladimir Shtapov (1996–97)
Igor Bychkov (1997, interim)
Ravil Sabitov (1997–99), (2001–02)
Alexandr Piskarev (2000)
Viktor Papayev (2000)
Aleksei Petrushin (2001)
Sergey Derkach (2002–03)
Dmitry Galyamin (2003)
Vasily Kulkov (2004)
Vladimir Shevchuk (2004)
Pavel Yakovenko (2004–05)
Vladimir Kazachyonok (2006–07)
Slavoljub Muslin (2007–08)
Sergei Yuran (2008)
Konstantin Sarsania (2009)
Igor Chugainov (2009)
Alexander Tarkhanov (2009–10)
Oleg Dolmatov (2011–12)
Alexander Tarkhanov (2012)
Valeriy Petrakov (2012–13)
Alexander Tarkhanov (2013)
Vladimir Mukhanov (2013–14)
Vladimir Maminov (2014–15)
Vadim Khafizov (2015–16)
Aleksandr Irkhin (2016–18)
Igor Shalimov (2018–19)
Andrei Talalayev (2019–20)
Sergei Yuran (2020)
Dmitri Gunko (2020)
Igor Cherevchenko (2020–Now)

Honours
Russian National Football League
Winners: 2006
Russian Professional Football League
Winners: 2000 (Centre), 2015–16 (West)

References

External links
Official website 
History at KLISF
The official fan club 

 
Association football clubs established in 1997
Football clubs in Russia
Football in Moscow Oblast
1997 establishments in Russia
FC